Eri Hozumi and Zhang Shuai were the defending champions, but Zhang chose to compete in Nanchang instead. Hozumi played alongside Makoto Ninomiya, but lost in the quarterfinals to Christina McHale and Valeria Savinykh.

Misaki Doi and Nao Hibino won the title, defeating McHale and Savinykh in the final, 3–6, 6–4, [10–4].

Seeds

Draw

Draw

References

External Links
Draw

Japan Women's Open - Women's Doubles
2019 Women's Doubles
2019 Japan Women's Open